Lee Dong-won (Hangul:이동원) (born November 18, 1996) is a South Korean figure skater. He is the 2011 South Korean national senior champion and competed in the free skate at the 2014 Four Continents Championships.

Programs

Competitive highlights 
CS: Challenger Series; JGP: Junior Grand Prix

References

External links 
 

1996 births
South Korean male single skaters
Living people
Figure skaters from Seoul